This is a list of airlines currently operating in São Tomé and Príncipe.

See also
 List of airlines
 List of air carriers banned in the European Union
 List of defunct Airlines of Sao Tome and Principe

São Tomé and Príncipe
Airlines
Airlines
Sao Tome and Principe